Cronbach's alpha (Cronbach's ), also known as rho-equivalent reliability or coefficient alpha (coefficient ), is a reliability coefficient that provides a method of measuring internal consistency of tests and measures. Numerous studies warn against using it unconditionally, and note that reliability coefficients based on structural equation modeling (SEM) or generalizability theory are in many cases a suitable alternative in certain situations.

History

Cronbach (1951) 
As with previous studies, Cronbach (1951) published an additional method to derive Cronbach's alpha. His interpretation was more intuitively attractive than those of previous studies and became quite popular.

After 1951

Cronbach (1978) mentioned that the reason Cronbach (1951) received a lot of citations was "mostly because [he] put a brand name on a common-place coefficient". He explained that he had originally planned to name other types of reliability coefficients (e.g., inter-rater reliability or test-retest reliability) after consecutive Greek letters (e.g.), but later changed his mind.

Cronbach opposed the use of the name Cronbach's alpha, and explicitly denied the existence of studies that had published the general formula of KR-20 prior to Cronbach (1951).

Prerequisites for using Cronbach's alpha 
In order to use Cronbach’s alpha as a reliability coefficient, the data from the measure must satisfy the following conditions:
 Normality distributed and linear
 Tau-equivalence (essential)
 Independence between errors

Formula and calculation 
Cronbach’s alpha is calculated by taking the score from each scale item and correlating them with the total score for each observation and then comparing that with the variance for all individual item scores. Cronbach’s alpha is best understood as a function of the number of questions or items in a measure, the between pairs of items average covariance, and the overall variance of the total measured score. the number of items in the measure

 variance associated with each

 variance associated of the total scores

Common misconceptions

The value of Cronbach's alpha ranges between zero and one
By definition, reliability cannot be less than zero and cannot be greater than one. Many textbooks mistakenly equate  with reliability and give an inaccurate explanation of its range.  can be less than reliability when applied to data that are not tau-equivalent. The covariance matrix between items is as follows, .

Negative  can occur for reasons such as negative discrimination or mistakes in processing reversely scored items.

Unlike , SEM-based reliability coefficients (e.g.) are always greater than or equal to zero.

This anomaly was first pointed out by Cronbach (1943) to criticize , but Cronbach (1951) did not comment on this problem in his article, which discussed all conceivable issues related .

If there is no measurement error, the value of Cronbach's alpha is one
This anomaly also originates from the fact that  underestimates reliability. The covariance matrix between items is as follows, .

For the above data, both  and  have a value of one.

The above example is presented by Cho and Kim (2015).

A high value of Cronbach's alpha indicates homogeneity between the items
This misconception stems from the inaccurate explanation of Cronbach (1951) that high  values show homogeneity between the items. Homogeneity is a term that is rarely used in the modern literature, and related studies interpret the term as referring to uni-dimensionality. Several studies have provided proofs or counterexamples that high  values do not indicate uni-dimensionality. See counterexamples below.

 in the unidimensional data above.

 in the multidimensional data above.

The above data have , but are multidimensional.

The above data have , but are unidimensional.

You should check uni-dimensionality before calculating , rather than calculating  to check uni-dimensionality.

A high value of Cronbach's alpha indicates internal consistency
The term internal consistency is commonly used in the reliability literature, but its meaning is not clearly defined. Cronbach (1951) used the term in several senses without an explicit definition.

Removing items using "alpha if item deleted" always increases reliability
Removing an item using "alpha if item deleted" may result in 'alpha inflation,' where sample-level reliability is reported to be higher than population-level reliability. It may also reduce population-level reliability. The elimination of less-reliable items should be based not only on a statistical basis but also on a theoretical and logical basis. It is also recommended that the whole sample be divided into two and cross-validated.

Ideal reliability level and how to increase reliability

Nunnally's recommendations for the level of reliability
The most frequently cited source of how high reliability coefficients should be is Nunnally's book. However, his recommendations are cited contrary to his intentions. What he meant was to apply different criteria depending on the purpose or stage of the study. However, regardless of the nature of the research, such as exploratory research, applied research, and scale development research, a criterion of 0.7 is universally used. 0.7 is the criterion he recommended for the early stages of a study, which most studies published in the journal are not. Rather than 0.7, the criterion of 0.8 referred to applied research by Nunnally is more appropriate for most empirical studies.

His recommendation level did not imply a cutoff point. If a criterion means a cutoff point, it is important whether or not it is met, but it is unimportant how much it is over or under. He did not mean that it should be strictly 0.8 when referring to the criteria of 0.8. If the reliability has a value near 0.8 (e.g., 0.78), it can be considered that his recommendation has been met.

Cost to obtain a high level of reliability
Nunnally's idea was that there is a cost to increasing reliability, so there is no need to try to obtain maximum reliability in every situation.

Trade-off with validity
Measurements with perfect reliability lack validity. For example, a person who take the test with the reliability of one will get a perfect score or a zero score, because the examinee who gives the correct answer or incorrect answer on one item will give the correct answer or incorrect answer on all other items. The phenomenon in which validity is sacrificed to increase reliability is called attenuation paradox.

A high value of reliability can be in conflict with content validity. For high content validity, each item should be constructed to be able to comprehensively represent the content to be measured. However, a strategy of repeatedly measuring essentially the same question in different ways is often used only for the purpose of increasing reliability.

Trade-off with efficiency
When the other conditions are equal, reliability increases as the number of items increases. However, the increase in the number of items hinders the efficiency of measurements.

Methods to increase reliability 
Despite the costs associated with increasing reliability discussed above, a high level of reliability may be required. The following methods can be considered to increase reliability.

Before data collection:
 Eliminate the ambiguity of the measurement item.
 Do not measure what the respondents do not know.
 Increase the number of items. However, care should be taken not to excessively inhibit the efficiency of the measurement.
 Use a scale that is known to be highly reliable.
 Conduct a pretest - discover in advance the problem of reliability.
 Exclude or modify items that are different in content or form from other items (e.g., reverse-scored items).

After data collection:
 Remove the problematic items using "alpha if item deleted". However, this deletion should be accompanied by a theoretical rationale.

Which reliability coefficient to use

 is used in an overwhelming proportion. A study estimates that approximately 97% of studies use  as a reliability coefficient.

However, simulation studies comparing the accuracy of several reliability coefficients have led to the common result that  is an inaccurate reliability coefficient.

Simplifying and classifying the conclusions of existing studies are as follows.
 Conditional use: Use  only when certain conditions are met.
 Opposition to use:  is inferior and should not be used.

Alternatives to Cronbach's alpha 
Existing studies are practically unanimous in that they oppose the widespread practice of using  unconditionally for all data.

Different reliability coefficients ranked first in each simulation study comparing the accuracy of several reliability coefficients.

However, there is no consensus on which of the several SEM-based reliability coefficients (e.g., unidimensional or multidimensional models) is the best to use.

Some people suggest  as an alternative, but  shows information that is completely different from reliability.  is a type of coefficient comparable to Revelle's . They do not substitute, but complement reliability.

Software for SEM-based reliability coefficients
General-purpose statistical software such as SPSS and SAS include a function to calculate . Users who don't know the formula of  have no problem in obtaining the estimates with just a few mouse clicks.

SEM software such as AMOS, LISREL, and MPLUS does not have a function to calculate SEM-based reliability coefficients. Users need to calculate the result by inputting it to the formula. To avoid this inconvenience and possible error, even studies reporting the use of SEM rely on  instead of SEM-based reliability coefficients. There are a few alternatives to automatically calculate SEM-based reliability coefficients.

 R (free): The psych package calculates various reliability coefficients.
 EQS (paid): This SEM software has a function to calculate reliability coefficients.
 RelCalc (free): Available with Microsoft Excel.  can be obtained without the need for SEM software. Various multidimensional SEM reliability coefficients and various types of  can be calculated based on the results of SEM software.

References

External links
 Cronbach's alpha SPSS tutorial
 The free web interface and R package cocron allows to statistically compare two or more dependent or independent Cronbach alpha coefficients.

Comparison of assessments
Statistical reliability
Psychometrics